Charlene Denise White (born 22 June 1980) is a British television broadcaster, journalist and presenter, best known for presenting ITV News programmes. She has been an anchor on Loose Women since 2021 and appeared on the ITV reality show I’m A Celebrity…Get Me Out Of Here! in November 2022.

Early life
White was born in Greenwich, London, to West Indian parents. She has a brother and sister. She attended Riverston School and Blackheath High School in southeast London and graduated from the London College of Printing.

Career
White was a presenter and senior broadcast journalist at BBC Look East, Radio 5 Live Morning Reports, BBC Three 60 Seconds and BBC News. She also had her own late-night talk show on BBC London 94.9.

In 2002, she joined Radio 1 Newsbeat and its sister digital station BBC Radio 1Xtra as a reporter. In 2005 she teamed up with DJ G Money as presenter on 1Xtra's two-hour news, magazine and documentary programme TX. She has also previously worked as a reporter and producer for ITV News Meridian on ITV Meridian in Kent.

In 2008, she joined ITN, as a newscaster for the ITV News at 5:30 on ITV. Additionally she would present three short opts which aired as part of GMTV (later Daybreak) for ITV News London on ITV London. She discontinued these roles on 10 October 2012, though remained as a presenter of ITV News Londons main 6pm programme.

On 9 April 2014, White became the first black woman to present ITV News at Ten and was an occasional relief presenter until October 2015. She also occasionally presented the ITV Weekend News until 2019.

White continues to act as relief presenter of the ITV Lunchtime News & ITV Evening News.

On 30 May 2019, White was announced as lead presenter of ITV News Londons main 6pm programme.

On 12 August 2020, White made her debut as a guest presenter of Loose Women. She returned on 11 January 2021, where it was announced she was to become a regular presenter, following Andrea McLean's departure from the show.

In November 2022, White appeared in series 22 of I'm a Celebrity...Get Me Out of Here!. On day 13, White was the first celebrity to be evicted.

Personal life
White lives in South London.

While presenting an ITV News bulletin, she refused to wear a Remembrance Day poppy, stating: "I prefer to be neutral and impartial on screen so that one of those charities doesn't feel less favoured than another." It was reported that following the decision to not wear a poppy, she faced racist and sexist abuse on Twitter.

White and her partner have two children, a son born August 2017 and a daughter born October 2019.

In the 2020 and 2021 editions of the Powerlist, White was listed in the Top 100 of the most influential people in the UK of African/African-Caribbean descent.

Filmography

See also
 List of I'm a Celebrity...Get Me Out of Here! (British TV series) contestants

References

External links

1980 births
Living people
Black British television personalities
BBC newsreaders and journalists
ITN newsreaders and journalists
People from Greenwich
People educated at Blackheath High School
English people of Jamaican descent
I'm a Celebrity...Get Me Out of Here! (British TV series) participants